The 2019 Canterbury Cup NSW is the 1st season since the name change, and is the current season of professional rugby league in New South Wales, Australia.

Regular season

Round 1

Round 2

Round 3

Round 4

Round 5

Round 6

Round 7

Round 8

Round 9 
General Bye

Round 10 (Magic Round)

Round 11

Round 12

Round 13

Round 14

Round 15

Round 16

Round 17

Round 18

Round 19

Round 20

Round 21

Round 22

Round 23

Round 24

Finals Series

Grand Final

References 

Rugby league in New South Wales
2019 in Australian rugby league